A Christmas Tree Miracle is a 2013 holiday film produced by Flyover Films in association with Route 40 Films.

Plot
The story centers on the George family. Bothered by the upcoming Christmas holiday, father David (Kevin Sizemore) is focused on work, mother Julie (Claudia Esposito) is frazzled by the season and teens Nick (Barrett Carnahan) and Natalie (Emily Capehart) are focused on their ever-growing Christmas lists.  It's only 6 year old Nina (Siomha Kenney) who truly has any Christmas spirit.  When David loses his land developer job right before the holidays, the family's finances cascade out of control until an eccentric tree farmer named Henry (Terry Kiser) offers them a place to stay and a new chance at their lives.

Cast
Kevin Sizemore (David George)
Claudia Esposito (Julie George)
Terry Kiser (Henry Banks)
Jill Whelan (Cindy Cruthers)
Barrett Carnahan (Nick George)
Emily Capehart (Natalie George)
Siomha Kenney (Nina George)
Michael Guy Allen (Senator John Cutter)

Production
A Christmas Tree Miracle was produced by Kristin Seibert, Dolph Santorine, JW Myers and Ty DeMartino.  The film was written by Ty DeMartino and directed by JW Myers.  Ryan Schlagbaum served as editor and director of photography.  Music was composed by Oscar-nominated and Emmy Award winner Bruce Broughton.  The movie was filmed in 2011 on the Feisley Tree farm in Belmont, Ohio and in the Wheeling, West Virginia area.  

The film premiered at the Capitol Theatre in Wheeling in December 2013, coinciding with a DVD release by Green Apple Entertainment (U.S.) and Spotlight Pictures (international).  The movie made its U.S. television premiere during UPTV's "Everything You Love about Christmas" on November 26, 2014.

Reception
The Dove Foundation said it "is entertaining and uplifting for everyone, earning it the Dove Seal of Approval for All Ages."

See also 
 List of Christmas films

References

External links
 

2013 films
American Christmas films
Films shot in West Virginia
2010s Christmas films